Lacan-Tun Biosphere Reserve is a protected natural area in southeastern Mexico. It is located in the Lacandon Forest of eastern Chiapas state, where it protects 618.74 km2 of lowland rain forest. Lacan-Tun reserve was established by the Mexican government in 1992.

Lacan-Tun Biosphere Reserve borders Montes Azules Biosphere Reserve on the southwest, and is bounded by the Lacantun River on the southeast.

References

Biosphere reserves of Mexico
Protected areas of Chiapas
Petén–Veracruz moist forests